Warren County is a county located in the south central portion of the U.S. state of Kentucky. As of the 2020 census, the population was 134,554, making it the fifth-most populous county in Kentucky. The county seat is Bowling Green. Warren County is now classified as a wet county after voters approved the measure in 2018. The measure became law in January 2019 that allows alcohol to be sold county wide.

Warren County is included in the Bowling Green, KY Metropolitan Statistical Area. It is located in the Pennyroyal Plateau and Western Coal Fields regions.

History
Warren County was the location of several Native American villages and ancient burial mounds constructed by earlier cultures. The first white men to enter the area were the long hunters in the 1770s. General Elijah Covington was among the first landowners. McFadden's Station, one of the earliest settlements, was established in 1785 by Andrew McFadden/McFadin on the northern bank of the Barren River at the Cumberland Trace.

Warren County became the 23rd county of Kentucky in 1796, from a section of Logan County. It was named after General Joseph Warren of the Revolutionary War. He dispatched William Dawes and Paul Revere on their famous midnight ride to warn residents of the approaching British troops. He was also a hero of the Battle of Bunker Hill.

Through the riverboat trade, Warren County thrived in the agricultural market. In 1859, the Louisville and Nashville Railroad (currently CSX Transportation) was laid through the county.

During the Civil War, most residents are said to have favored the Union. Because of its strategic value Warren County was occupied by Confederate forces in September 1861. It was occupied in turn by the Union Army on February 14, 1862, following the Confederate retreat to Tennessee. During the Confederate withdrawal, they destroyed railroad bridges in Barren County, the Bowling Green train depot and other railroad buildings to hinder Union pursuit.

The completion of Interstate 65 and Green River Parkway, later renamed the William H. Natcher Parkway, (and in 2019 was renamed as the I-165) in the 1960s and 1970s, brought an industrial boom that transformed the farm-oriented county into a more urban one.

In 1997, Bowling Green became a Tree City USA, sponsored by the National Arbor Day Foundation.

Geography

Geographic features
The Green River forms the northern boundary of the county, and was a means of transportation for settlers. Tributaries of the Green River that flow through Warren County are the Barren and Gasper rivers, Drake's and Jennings creeks and Bay's Fork. In the north the land is possibly the most rugged, since it lies between the Green and Barren rivers, with very tall ridges near Riverside and Richardsville. The major drainage in Warren county is Barren River, which flows through Bowling Green and is surrounded by steep ridges in some areas. Several sizable hills rise in Bowling Green proper. They were favored for forts and other development: a reservoir, hospital, and Civil War fort were built on one; much of Western Kentucky University's campus on another; Hobson Grove, a historic Italian Renaissance style civil war era plantation estate on another; and a second civil war fort on another. In the east the land is rolling (much like central Kentucky's landscape) near Drakes Creek. The land in the south and southwest of the county is predominantly flat. In the western side of the county, the land is hilly with steep ridges and rocky and cliff-ridden near Gasper River. Shanty Hollow Lake is in the northwest corner of the county.

The flat elevated areas in the west and the flatland in the south and southwest have soil that is fertile and supports tobacco, hay, corn and soybean crop production.  The rest of the land is predominantly clay soil; it is rocky and not very suitable for agriculture. Many residents rear livestock and horses, or hunt in these areas.

Major highways

 Interstate 65
 Interstate 165
 U.S. 231
 U.S. 31-W
 U.S. 68
 KY 80
 KY 185
 KY 234
 KY 880

Adjacent counties
 Butler County - northwest
 Edmonson County - northeast
 Barren County - east
 Allen County - southeast
 Simpson County - south
 Logan County - southwest

Demographics

As of the census of 2000, there were 92,522 people, 35,365 households and 23,411 families residing in the county. The racial makeup of the county was 86.98% White, 8.58% Black or African American, 0.24% Native American, 1.35% Asian, 0.08% Pacific Islander, 1.33% from other races, and 1.45% from two or more races. 2.67% of the population were Hispanic or Latino of any race.

There were 35,365 households, of which 31.40% had children under the age of 18 living with them, 51.40% were married couples living together, 11.20% had a female householder with no husband present, and 33.80% were non-families. 26.10% of all households were made up of individuals, and 8.30% had someone living alone who was 65 years of age or older. The average household size was 2.46 and the average family size was 2.97.

The age distribution was 23.10% under the age of 18, 16.20% from 18 to 24, 29.10% from 25 to 44, 21.10% from 45 to 64, and 10.50% who were 65 years of age or older. The median age was 32 years. For every 100 females, there were 96.20 males. For every 100 females age 18 and over, there were 93.00 males.

The median household income was $36,151, and the median family income was $45,142. Males had a median income of $32,063 versus $22,777 for females. The per capita income for the county was $18,847. About 10.80% of families and 15.40% of the population were below the poverty line, including 17.80% of those under age 18 and 13.80% of those age 65 or over.

Politics

Education
Two public school districts operate in the county:
 Warren County Public Schools, which serves most of the county, including outerlying parts of Bowling Green
 Bowling Green Independent Schools, which serves most of the city of Bowling Green.

High schools include:
 County schools
 Greenwood
 Light House Academy
 Warren Central
 Warren East
 South Warren High School
 GEO International High School

 Bowling Green ISD
 Bowling Green High School

There is also a state-operated public school for gifted students
 Carol Martin Gatton Academy of Mathematics and Science in Kentucky

There are also private schools including
 Anchored Christian School
 Bowling Green Christian Academy
 Foundation Christian Academy
 St. Joseph School, a private Catholic school of the Roman Catholic Diocese of Owensboro.

Colleges and universities
 Southcentral Kentucky Community and Technical College
 Western Kentucky University

Public Library System
 Warren County Public Library

Attractions
 Beech Bend Park - roller coasters, waterpark, raceway
 Chevrolet Corvette and XLR Assembly Plant - daily tours
 Eloise B. Houchens Center - Greek Revival-style mansion built in 1904 by a former Bowling Green mayor
 Fort Webb Historic Park - preserved Civil War site
 Historic Railpark at the L&N Depot - two floor train museum with 6 restored railcars inside a 1925 depot.
 Kentucky Museum and Library - exhibits of Kentucky artifacts, located on Western Kentucky University campus
 Lost River Cave and Valley - location of the shortest and deepest river in the world, once a hideout for Jesse James and company
 National Corvette Museum - exhibits of the models of the Chevrolet Corvette since 1953
 Riverview at Hobson Grove - preserved mansion overlooking Barren River built from the late 1850s until 1872

Communities

Cities
 Bowling Green (county seat)
 Oakland
 Plum Springs
 Smiths Grove
 Woodburn

Census-designated place
 Plano

Other unincorporated places

 Hays

Northeast Warren

 Anna
 Bristow
 Girkin
 Glenmore
 Gotts
 Hydro
 Kepler
 Martinsville
 Polkville
 Pondsville
 Richardsville
 Riverside
 Sunnyside
 Three Forks
 Tuckertown

Southwest Warren

 Alvaton
 Blue Level
 Boyce
 Browning
 Claypool
 Drake
 Greenhill
 Guy
 Hadley
 Hardcastle
 Lost River
 Matlock
 Memphis Junction
 Petros
 Rich Pond
 Rockfield
 Rockland
 Shawnee Estates
 Springhill
 Three Springs

See also
 National Register of Historic Places listings in Warren County, Kentucky

References

External links
 Warren County Government
 Warren County Public Library
 Beech Bend Park - Official Page
 Bowling Green Daily News
 Corvette Museum
 Corvette Bowling Green Plant
 KYGenWeb Project, Warren County
 Lost River Cave - Official Page
 The Kentucky Museum

 
Kentucky counties
1796 establishments in Kentucky
Bowling Green metropolitan area, Kentucky
Populated places established in 1796